The Vision Gran Turismo program (commonly abbreviated Vision GT or VGT) is a series of concept cars for the Gran Turismo video game series, developed by a cross-section of the world's top automobile manufacturers. These cars appeared originally in the video game Gran Turismo 6, and later made an appearance in each subsequent Gran Turismo installment (Gran Turismo Sport and Gran Turismo 7), all developed by Polyphony Digital. For the most part, they apply present-day technology and materials, with a handful of notable exceptions that utilize novel propulsion and aerodynamic technologies. Their appearance as free update content has been staggered since the launch of GT6 in 2013, with each one being available for download upon release.

The cars have been met with critical acclaim for their novel approach to aesthetics and performance. Real-life full-size models have been shown at motor shows in Japan, Canada, Germany, England, the US and Switzerland.

Background
The name "Vision Gran Turismo" was originally used for a Gran Turismo HD trailer in 2006. In 2013, to commemorate the 15th anniversary of the series, Polyphony Digital announced "Vision Gran Turismo", a special project featuring concept cars designed for the game by automobile companies such as Nissan, Peugeot and Mercedes-Benz, as well as coachbuilders such as Zagato, and sportswear brands Air Jordan and Nike.

Gran Turismo 6
The Vision Gran Turismo project first featured in Gran Turismo 6. Each Vision GT concept car added to the game after its initial release was accompanied with limited-time seasonal events, allowing players to obtain the car by completing a full lap around a specific track.

Mercedes-Benz AMG Vision Gran Turismo 

The first Vision Gran Turismo car was released on 20 November 2013 by Mercedes-Benz, simply named the "Mercedes-Benz AMG Vision Gran Turismo". It took the form of a long-hooded coupe (inspired by the 300 SL) with no rear window and an active rear spoiler. Eight rectangular exhaust tips are located above and below the single long taillight.

Another virtual Mercedes-Benz model was the first Vision Gran Turismo release for 2014. Based on the original model albeit with racing modifications, the car was named the "Mercedes-Benz AMG Vision Gran Turismo Racing Series", and was released on 28 January 2014 as the second official Vision Gran Turismo concept car.

BMW Vision Gran Turismo 
BMW released their own project almost six months later, with the "BMW Vision Gran Turismo" (released on 14 May 2014 in update 1.07). This was a coupe modelled after BMW's touring cars from the 1970s, with plenty of aerodynamic elements and a 3-litre twin-turbo inline-six engine producing .

Mitsubishi Concept XR-PHEV EVOLUTION Vision Gran Turismo 
Mitsubishi Motors followed with the "Mitsubishi Concept XR-PHEV EVOLUTION Vision Gran Turismo" (released on 30 May 2014 in update 1.08). Mitsubishi's entry was, as its name suggests, a plug-in hybrid with aggressive, rally-oriented widebody styling.

Volkswagen GTI Roadster Vision Gran Turismo 

Volkswagen released the fifth Vision Gran Turismo concept car a month later, on 18 June 2014. Named the "Volkswagen GTI Roadster Vision Gran Turismo", the low open-top car was then included in the 1.09 update. It is powered by a 3-litre twin-turbo VR6 engine producing .

Nissan CONCEPT 2020 Vision Gran Turismo 
The next month had the unveiling of two Vision Gran Turismo cars from two separate brands that were both made available on 25 July 2014.

The "Nissan CONCEPT 2020 Vision Gran Turismo" was conceptualised by young designers in the UK before being fleshed out with the assistance of Nissan's engineers in Japan. It is the seventh car in the program. The end result contains an emphasis on handling and aerodynamics; the car's fenders cut through the air while the undertray creates a passive vacuum, and an active rear spoiler transfers downforce loads directly onto the rear axle. The CONCEPT 2020 is powered by a hybrid system consisting of a V6 engine and three motors (two for each of the front wheels, and one for the rear axle). A full-scale replica in a special "Fire Knight" paint colour was displayed at the 44th Tokyo Motor Show in 2014.

Aston Martin DP100 Vision Gran Turismo 

Released alongside the Nissan, Aston Martin's Vision Gran Turismo car is called the "Aston Martin DP100 Vision Gran Turismo", with "DP" being an acronym for "Design Prototype". It contains an  twin-turbo V12 engine, headlights nestled within NACA ducts on the front fenders, active wheel "blades" to aid in brake cooling, and "light blade" taillights later seen on the limited-production Vulcan.

Toyota FT-1 Vision Gran Turismo 
The final four months of 2014 saw the release of five Vision Gran Turismo cars, with the "Toyota FT-1 Vision Gran Turismo" from Toyota (released on 16 September 2014, update 1.11) being the first. This was a virtual overhaul of Toyota's original FT-1 concept with Group GT3-style aerodynamics.

Subaru VIZIV GT Vision Gran Turismo 
The FT-1 VGT was followed by the "Subaru VIZIV GT Vision Gran Turismo" from Subaru (released on 19 November 2014, update 1.14), which designer Tomoyuki Kato states was inspired by katsuobushi. This is evoked by the solid, chiseled appearance of the VIZIV GT. It combines Subaru's signature flat-four engine and all-wheel drive layout with electric motors and a torque vectoring system.

Chevrolet-Chaparral 2X Vision Gran Turismo 

The "Chevrolet-Chaparral 2X Vision Gran Turismo" from Chevrolet was released next, created in collaboration with Chaparral (released on 17 December 2014, update 1.15). The vehicle can be seen as an extension of the driver's body, with controls located at the end of each limb in place of a steering wheel and the driver's head within a specialized helmet that integrates with the car's shape. The fictional laser propulsion unit, claimed to be developed by Chevrolet, can be aimed at a specific point on the track surface for increased downforce.

Infiniti CONCEPT Vision Gran Turismo 
Alongside the Chevrolet-Chaparral 2X it was the "Infiniti CONCEPT Vision Gran Turismo" from Infiniti. The "Infiniti CONCEPT Vision Gran Turismo" was created out of Infiniti's desire to create a "pure Infiniti GT car" for the Vision Gran Turismo project. It is powered by a 4.5-litre naturally aspirated V8 engine, and possesses a 45:55 front/rear weight balance for optimum driving enjoyment. In December 2018, the car was added to Asphalt 8: Airborne, being the first Vision Gran Turismo car to appear outside of the Gran Turismo series.

Mazda LM55 Vision Gran Turismo 

The "Mazda LM55 Vision Gran Turismo" from Mazda was released on 24 December 2014 through its own update and originally found by players before its confirmed addition to the game. It is a low-slung Le Mans Prototype powered by a Skyactiv rotary engine with unknown specifications, and draws inspiration from the company's own 787B Group C car combined with their current "Kodo" design language.

The LM55 was included as part of a sculpture displayed at the 2015 Goodwood Festival of Speed, which was subsequently recreated in GT6's version of the Goodwood course for update 1.20.

Mini Clubman Vision Gran Turismo 
Another nine cars were added in 2015 for GT6, with a Mini being the first. Revealed as the "Mini Clubman Vision Gran Turismo", the car was added to update 1.16, released on 26 February 2015. A widebody hatchback with X-shaped stickers on the round headlights to simulate tape (used decades ago to keep broken headlight lenses from littering the track), the Clubman Vision Gran Turismo was designed solely for racing.

Alpine Vision Gran Turismo 
Three cars were revealed a month later on 18 March 2015 in update 1.17, two of which were from Alpine. The "Alpine Vision Gran Turismo" is an open-top car with a focus on agility. Active aero panels are integrated into the rear fenders and deploy upon braking; the inner faces of the panels contain brake lights that are only visible when the panels are deployed. The "Alpine Vision Gran Turismo Race Mode" is essentially the sportiest version, with an added rear wing for improved handling.

Lexus LF-LC GT Vision Gran Turismo 
Lexus revealed their LF-LC alongside Alpine's concept cars in update 1.17. Much like the earlier "Toyota FT-1 Vision Gran Turismo", the "Lexus LF-LC GT Vision Gran Turismo" is a touring car-style refresh of Lexus' earlier Lexus LF-LC concept car. The in-game car sports a unique livery featuring iridescent brush strokes on the otherwise white body.

Volkswagen GTI Supersport Vision Gran Turismo 
Volkswagen's second Vision Gran Turismo car was added to the game on 13 April 2015 in update 1.18, known as the "Volkswagen GTI Supersport Vision Gran Turismo". Unlike its Roadster counterpart, the Supersport is a closed-cockpit car, with larger headlights and taillights. Its engine is assumed to be the same as the one in the Roadster, with an identical configuration and power output.

Peugeot Vision Gran Turismo 
Peugeot would release their first of three Vision Gran Turismo cars in the program, the first one known simply as the "Peugeot Vision Gran Turismo". The car was added in update 1.19, on 31 May 2015. It is powered by a midship-mounted 3.2-litre V6 and has an active rear wing.

SRT Tomahawk Vision Gran Turismo 

The final three cars added to the Gran Turismo 6 game were all from SRT, the performance division of Dodge.

They were added in the game's third-last update patch, 1.20, released on 26 June 2015, owing to the upcoming cessation of support for the PlayStation 3.

Release history

Gran Turismo Sport
The first four VGT cars to first appear in Gran Turismo Sport were all announced before the original release of the game and subsequently released in the beta releases of the game.

Hyundai N 2025 Vision Gran Turismo 

Hyundai Motor Company were the first to release their car, with the "Hyundai N 2025 Vision Gran Turismo", first launched on 14 September 2015 and later first playable in the closed beta version of Gran Turismo Sport. The car served as a launch platform for Hyundai's N performance division, as well as a glimpse into the future of fuel cell technology in motorsports.

Bugatti Vision Gran Turismo 

Bugatti became the second to unveil their car, with the "Bugatti Vision Gran Turismo", which was originally teased in a trailer titled #imaginEBugatti. The car was unveiled two weeks later, releasing on 24 September 2015. It is essentially a racing-oriented precursor to the Chiron, with Bugatti's signature W16 engine, and pays homage to the Bugatti Type 57s that won the 24 Hours of Le Mans in 1937 and 1939.

Fittipaldi EF7 Vision Gran Turismo by Pininfarina 

On 1 February 2017, Fittipaldi Motors, headed by Emerson Fittipaldi, teased their Vision GT car, the "Fittipaldi EF7 Vision Gran Turismo by Pininfarina", a collaboration between Fittipaldi, Pininfarina, and HWA. The model for the car was revealed on 7 March 2017 at the Geneva International Motor Show. A limited production run of 39 track-only vehicles was planned, with owners eligible for race coaching from Fittipaldi himself. Production did not come to fruition when the company became inactive in March 2019; the car was subsequently removed from Gran Turismo 7.

McLaren Ultimate Vision Gran Turismo 
On 20 September 2017, McLaren Automotive teased their Vision GT car, the "McLaren Ultimate Vision Gran Turismo". It was revealed the next day. For a vastly improved field of vision, the car is driven in a prone position (but from within a closed cockpit and using a steering wheel, unlike the Chaparral 2X), and it also possesses a hybrid system and lightweight structure. The Ultimate Vision GT's design influenced the McLaren Sabre (codenamed BC-03), a limited edition model built by McLaren Special Operations for sale in the United States.

Daihatsu Copen RJ Vision Gran Turismo 
Daihatsu added their own VGT car, based on the second-generation Copen, called the "Daihatsu Copen RJ Vision Gran Turismo" ("RJ" for "Racing Jacket"). It is a closed-top version of the Copen with performance improvements.

Peugeot L500R and L750R HYbrid Vision Gran Turismo
Peugeot also added a second and third car to the program, dubbed the "Peugeot L500R HYbrid Vision Gran Turismo", and its racing variant, the "Peugeot L750R HYbrid Vision Gran Turismo". Both cars were added in the first stable release of the game. The L500R had initially been presented as a concept car honoring Peugeot's 1916 Indianapolis 500 victory in 2016, with no mention of the Vision Gran Turismo program in the car's initial launch.

IsoRivolta Zagato Vision Gran Turismo 

IsoRivolta and Zagato revealed their car on 24 October 2017 as the "IsoRivolta Zagato Vision Gran Turismo".

Honda Sports Vision Gran Turismo 
The last Vision Gran Turismo car of 2017 came on November 9, when Honda debuted the "Honda Sports Vision Gran Turismo". At its core a smaller version of the Honda NSX, it weighs just  and is powered by a mid-mounted 2-litre turbocharged inline-four engine producing . Patent designs filed in 2015 for the car, along with the related "ZSX" trademark filing the following year, caused media speculation about a potential Honda S2000 successor positioned below the NSX; Honda has since denied any plans to put such car into production.

Audi e-tron Vision Gran Turismo 

On 4 April 2018, Audi Sport GmbH teased their Vision Gran Turismo car under the YouTube channel of Gran Turismo. The car was revealed four days later in fully functioning form, and in Gran Turismo Sport, as the "Audi e-tron Vision Gran Turismo". Another car was revealed alongside the e-tron, but abandons the "e-tron" moniker and uses a 3.4-liter turbocharged V6, making it a hybrid. This car was simply named the "Audi Vision Gran Turismo" and only exists in-game.

Jaguar Vision Gran Turismo Coupé 
After more than a year of inactivity concerning the Vision Gran Turismo program, Jaguar officially unveiled their "Vision Gran Turismo Coupé" on 25 October 2019. It was added to the game on 28 November 2019.

Release history

Race-regulated variants 
Several of the Vision Gran Turismo cars have variants that have been modified and homologated to meet regulations for race classes, such as Group GT3 and WEC. All unmodified base VGT cars are in the open "Group X" category, intended for vehicles not suitable for other categories.

Gran Turismo 7

Lamborghini Lambo V12 Vision Gran Turismo 

On 24 November 2019 (the day of the 2019 FIA GTC World Finals), Lamborghini revealed the "Lambo V12 Vision Gran Turismo"—a single-seat performance car, loosely resembling a sports prototype, powered by the same V12 hybrid powertrain as the Sián FKP 37. Despite being unveiled when updates for Sport were still active (with the last Sport update as of November 2021 being 1.66 in July 2021, which added the second-generation Toyota GR86), the car was only first seen in action in the Gran Turismo 7 release date trailer.

Jaguar Vision Gran Turismo SV 

The "Jaguar Vision Gran Turismo SV" is a racing variant of the Vision Gran Turismo Coupé.

Jaguar Vision Gran Turismo Roadster 
The "Jaguar Vision Gran Turismo Roadster" is an open top variant of the Vision Gran Turismo Coupé.

Porsche Vision Gran Turismo 
Unveiled on 5 December 2021, the Porsche Vision Gran Turismo is an electric two-seat sports car with mid-engined proportions and design cues from the brand's previous models, such as front quad-LED headlights, a rear light bar, and aggressively flared fenders.

A separate concept, the 2019 Porsche 920 Vision, was designed with the Vision Gran Turismo series in mind before a different design was decided upon.

It is also the first (and currently only) Vision Gran Turismo vehicle to feature on the cover art of the games, as it is seen on the cover of GT7 alongside the Mazda RX-Vision GT3 Concept. A Spyder version of the car was first teased on 21 September 2022 and released with Update 1.23 on 29 September 2022.

Suzuki Vision Gran Turismo 
First appearing in the form of a highlighted silhouette in a Twitter teaser post from Kazunori Yamauchi on 21 May 2022, the Suzuki Vision Gran Turismo was revealed in its entirety five days later. This two-seat roadster, whose design was inspired by the Cappuccino and third-generation Swift Sport, possesses a hybrid system in the form of a  Suzuki Hayabusa engine and three electric motors. It can be seen as the successor to the MR-layout Suzuki GSX-R/4 concept from 2001, which was also a lightweight roadster powered by a Hayabusa engine (although the VGT, hybrid system aside, uses an FR layout).

A Group 3 variant of the Suzuki Vision Gran Turismo was later added in update 1.17 on June 23, 2022. This specific variant is powered by a twin-turbocharged 2.7-liter V8 engine formed by two Hayabusa engines on the same crankshaft, and lacks a hybrid system, making it rear-wheel drive only. The car has also been used in the first Gran Turismo World Series Nations Cup event of both the 2022 season and GT7.

Ferrari Vision Gran Turismo 
According to Ferrari, the Vision Gran Turismo "represents a futuristic design manifesto for Ferrari's road and racing cars". Inspiration for the design was partially drawn from the 330 P3.

Italdesign EXENEO Vision Gran Turismo 
The Italdesign EXENEO Vision Gran Turismo was revealed on February 20th, 2023. The car's IWD and active suspension systems allow it to be driven on many surfaces, including snow and dirt. In GT7, the car is available in a "Street Mode" or "Off-Road Mode" configuration.

Release history

Confirmed participants with no entries 
 Ford
 Genesis
 GM Design
 Jordan
 Nike
 Tesla

Note: The upcoming VGT cars listed above, with the exception of Genesis, have been present in Gran Turismo's website since Gran Turismo 6, but no further developments have since been announced.

Alfa Romeo and Gruppo Bertone had once been listed as participants in Vision Gran Turismo at launch. Alfa Romeo intended to introduce a Vision Gran Turismo car of their own, referred to as the Alfa Romeo 6C Biposto. However, for reasons yet unknown, Alfa Romeo withdrew from the project sometime in 2014. Bertone also revealed plans for their unnamed Vision Gran Turismo car, hinted to have an unconventional three-wheeler-like shape and a highly futuristic design. Later in 2014, Bertone filed for bankruptcy, with the car never having been incorporated into GT6.

Recognition 
On 23 January 2016, the Japan Car Design Awards ceremony (hosted by Car Styling) was held in Minato, Tokyo, where “Gran Turismo” received the Golden Marker Special Award in recognition of the contribution made with the “Vision Gran Turismo” project. The trophy was presented by a collection of journalists and car designers.

References

External links 
 https://www.gran-turismo.com/us/vgt/

Gran Turismo (series)
Concept cars
Fictional racing cars